Minuscule 1432 (in the Gregory-Aland numbering), is a Greek minuscule manuscript of the New Testament, on 225 parchment leaves (14.7 cm by 11.5 cm). Dated paleografically to the 12th century.

Description 

The codex contains a complete text of the four Gospels with some lacunae. Written in one column per page, in 28–29 lines per page (size of text 11.1 by 6.8 cm). 
It contains the pericope John 7:53-8:11.

Text 

The Greek text of the codex, is a representative of the Byzantine text-type. Kurt Aland did not place it in any Category.
It was not examined by the Claremont Profile Method.

History 

The codex came from Athos, now is located in the Bible Museum Münster (Ms. 3).

See also 

 List of New Testament minuscules (1001-2000)
 Textual criticism
 Bible Museum Münster

References

Further reading 

 K. Lake, Texts from Mount Athos, Studia biblica et ecclesiastica, 5 (Oxford 1902), pp. 88–185.

External links 

 Manuscripts of the Bible Museum 
 Images of manuscript 1432 at the CSNTM

Greek New Testament minuscules
12th-century biblical manuscripts